Mary L. Droser is an American paleontologist. She is known for her work in South Australia, including the discovery of several fossils to which she had naming rights. , she is part of a team preparing the nomination of the Flinders Ranges as a World Heritage Site.

Early life and education
Droser says that spending summers with her family on Shelter Island, New York first inspired her interest in the natural world. She says, "At age 5 I announced I wanted to be a marine biologist, then by age 10 I’d decided to become a geologist". 

She pursued geology at the University of Rochester and Binghamton University, and went on to obtain a PhD in paleontology at the University of Southern California.

Career

Discoveries and naming
In 2008, Droser's discovery of the fossil Funisia dorothea in Australia was published in the journal Science. Funisia is a single-species genus of upright worm-like animals that lived 555 million years ago. Funisia was hailed as the first known species to sexually reproduce. She named the species to honor her mother, Dorothy Droser, saying "She's come with me on digs and done all the cooking and taken care of the kids. It seemed the right thing to do."

Droser named the fossil Obamus, after U.S. president Barack Obama. She explained that the creature resembled an ear, a distinctive feature of Obama, and so named it for the former president.

On the same trip to the Flinders Ranges in 2018, the team also discovered the fossil Attenborites janeae, which Droser named for naturalist Sir David Attenborough.

Other activities
, Droser is part of a team acting on behalf of the Government of South Australia and the traditional owners of the Flinders Ranges, the Adnyamathanha people, to lodge the nomination for the Flinders Ranges as a World Heritage Site.

Awards and honors
1997:  Charles Schuchert Award given by the Paleontological Society to a person under 40 whose work reflects excellence and promise in the science of paleontology
2020: Doctoral Dissertation Advisor/Mentor Award from University of California, Riverside
 2022: National Academy of Sciences Award in Early Earth and Life Sciences - Charles Doolittle Walcott Medal

References

External links
UC Riverside Profiles: Mary L Droser

American paleontologists
Women paleontologists
20th-century American scientists
20th-century American women scientists
Living people
Year of birth missing (living people)